David t'Kindt (1699–1770), architect, practised his profession mainly in Ghent, Belgium. His work is mainly in the Rococo style and includes the following buildings:
The Hotel Oombergen (1745), Ghent, originally built as a family house, now seat of the Royal Academy of Dutch Language and Literature (Koninklijke Academie voor Nederlandse Taal- en Letterkunde).
The Mammelokker, Ghent, a small prison built on to the existing Gothic Cloth Hall
The Hoofwacht or city guardhouse, Ghent
The Town Hall, Lokeren
The Hotel de Coninck, Ghent

1699 births
1770 deaths
Architects of the Austrian Netherlands